William Barr (born 1950) is an American lawyer and government official.

William Barr may also refer to:
William G. Barr (1920–1987), Illinois state representative and businessman
William Barr (historian) (born 1940), Scottish historian at the University of Calgary, Canada
William Barr (artist) (1867–1933), California artist
Billy Barr (footballer) (born 1969), English footballer and coach
Billy Barr (naturalist), famous for collecting 40 years of climate change data